This is a list of newspapers in New Hampshire.

Daily newspapers 

 The Beachcomber of Hampton Beach
 The Berlin Daily Sun of Berlin
 The Citizen of Laconia (closed in 2016)
 Concord Monitor of Concord
 The Conway Daily Sun of Conway
 The Dartmouth at Dartmouth College (Hanover)
 Derry News of Derry
 Eagle Times of Claremont
 Foster's Daily Democrat of Dover
 The Keene Sentinel of Keene
 The Laconia Daily Sun of Laconia
 Manchester Ink Link of Manchester
 The Nashua Broadcaster in Nashua
 New Hampshire Union Leader of Manchester
 The Portsmouth Herald of Portsmouth
 The Telegraph of Nashua
 Valley News of Lebanon

Weekly newspapers 

 Bedford Bulletin - Bedford
 Bedford Journal - Bedford
 Berlin Reporter - Berlin
 Bow Times - Bow
 The Bridge Weekly Sho-Case - Woodsville
 Carriage Towne News - Kingston
 Carroll County Independent - Ossipee
 The Colebrook Chronicle - Colebrook
 The Concord Insider - Concord
 The Coös County Democrat - Lancaster
 The Exonian - Exeter
 Gilford Steamer - Gilford
 Goffstown News - Goffstown
 The Granite State News - Wolfeboro
 The Hippo - Manchester, Concord and Nashua editions
 Hooksett Banner - Hooksett
 Hudson-Litchfield News - Hudson and Litchfield
 InterTown Record - North Sutton
 The Littleton Courier - Littleton
 The Londonderry Times - Londonderry
 The Meredith News - Meredith
 Merrimack Journal - Merrimack
 Milford Cabinet - Milford
 The Monadnock Ledger Transcript - Peterborough (bi-weekly)
 Newfound Landing - Alexandria, Bridgewater, Bristol, Danbury, Groton, Hebron, Hill, and New Hampton
 The New Hampshire - University of New Hampshire
 New Hampshire Business Review - New Hampshire
 New Hampshire Free Press - Keene
 The New Hampshire Gazette - Portsmouth (bi-weekly)
 The News & Sentinel - Colebrook
 The Nutfield News - Londonderry
 Pelham-Windham News - Pelham and Windham
 Plymouth Record Enterprise - Plymouth
 Rochester Times - Rochester
 Salem Community Patriot - Salem
 Salem Observer - Salem
 The Tri-Town Times - Londonderry
 The Weirs Times - Weirs Beach
 Windham Independent News - Windham
 Winnisquam Echo - Tilton

Monthly newspapers
 Merrimack Valley Voice - Penacook

Defunct

Amherst
Newspapers published in Amherst, New Hampshire:

 The Amherst Journal, and the New-Hampshire Advertiser. W., Jan. 16, 1795-Jan. 9, 1796.
 Village Messenger. W., Jan. 9, 1796-Dec. 27, 1800+

Concord
Newspapers published in Concord, New Hampshire:

 Concord Herald. W., Mar. 9, 1791-Sept. 1, 1792.
 The Concord Herald, and Newhampshire Intelligencer. W., Jan. 6, 1790-Jan. 12, 1791.
 Courier of New Hampshire. W., Feb. 13, 1794-Dec. 27, 1800+
 The Federal Mirror. W., Apr. 10, 1795-Nov. 15, 1796.

 Hough's Concord Herald. W., Jan. 19, 1791-Mar. 2, 1791; Sept. 8, 1792-Jan. 30, 1794.
 The Mirror. W., Oct. 10, 1797-Sept. 2, 1799.
 The Mirrour. W., Oct. 29, 1792-Apr. 3, 1795.
 New Starr. W., Apr. 11-Oct. 3, 1797.
 Republican Gazetteer. W., Nov. 22, 1796-Jan. 17, 1797.
 Russell & Davis' Republican Gazetteer. W., Jan. 24-Apr. 4, 1797.
The Independent Democrat. W., 1849–1871.

Dover
Newspapers published in Dover, New Hampshire:

 The Phenix. W., Apr. (11), 1792-Aug. 29, 1795.
 Political and Sentimental Repository, Or Strafford Recorder. W., July 15-Jan. 6 (?) Or June 9 (?), 1791.
 The Political Repository, Or Stafford Recorder. W., Jan. 6(?) Or June 9(?), 1791-Jan. 4, 1792(?).
 The Sun. Dover Gazette, and County Advertiser. W., Nov. 18 Or 25, 1795-Dec. 31, 1800+

Exeter
Newspapers published in Exeter, New Hampshire:

 American Herald of Liberty. W., May 14, 1793-Nov. (?), 1795.
 Exeter Federal Miscellany. W., Jan. 16-Sept. 24, 1799.

 The Exeter Journal, or, New Hampshire Gazette. W., Feb. 17-May 5, 1778.
 The Exeter Journal, or, The New-Hampshire Gazette, and Tuesday's General Advertiser. W., May 12-June 9, 1778.
 The Exeter Journal, or, The New-Hampshire Gazette, and Tuesday's General Advertiser. W., Feb. 23-May 25, 1779.
 The Freeman's Oracle, and New-Hampshire Advertiser. W., July 1, 1786-Apr. 25, 1788.
 The Herald of Liberty. W., Feb. 20-May 8, 1793.
 The Herald of Liberty, or, Exeter Gazette. W., Nov. (?), 1795-July 12, 1796.
 Lamson's Weekly Visitor. W., May 5–27, 1795.
 The New Hampshire Gazette, or, Exeter Morning Chronicle. W., June 1-Aug. 31, 1776.
 The New-Hampshire (State) Gazette, or, Exeter Circulating Morning Chronicle. W., Sept. 7, 1776-Jan. 14, 1777.
 New-Hampshire Gazette, or, State Journal and General Advertiser. W., June 16, 1778-Feb. 16, 1779.
 The Newhampshire Gazetteer. W., Aug. 18, 1789-Feb. 13, 1793.
 Political Banquet, and Farmer's Feast. W., Oct. 8-Dec. 31, 1799.
 Ranlet's Federal Miscellany. W., Dec. 5, 1798-Jan. 9, 1799.
 The State Journal, or, The New-Hampshire Gazette, and Tuesday's Liberty Advertiser. W., Jan. 21, 1777-July 15, 1777.
 The Weekly Visitor. W., June 2–9, 1795.
 The Weekly Visitor, or, Exeter Gazette. W., June 16-Dec. 26, 1795.

Gilmanton
Newspapers published in Gilmanton, New Hampshire:

 The Gilmanton Gazette: and Farmers' Weekly Magazine. W., Aug. 30-Dec. 20, 1800.

Hanover
Newspapers published in Hanover, New Hampshire:

 Dartmouth Gazette. W., Aug. 27, 1799-Dec. 27, 1800+
 The Eagle, or, Dartmouth Centinel. W., July 22, 1793- July (?), 1798.

Keene
Newspapers published in Keene, New Hampshire:

 The Columbian Informer, or, Cheshire Journal. W., Apr. 4, 1793-July 21, 1795.
 The New-Hampshire Recorder, and the Weekly Advertiser. W., Aug. 7, 1787-Mar. 18, 1788; and Apr. 15, 1788- Mar. 3, 1791.
 New-Hampshire Sentinel. W., Mar. 23, 1799-Dec. 27, 1800+

 The Rising Sun. W., Aug. 11, 1795-June 23, 1798.

Meredith
Newspapers published in Meredith, New Hampshire:

 The Belknap Gazette. Sep 6,1842-July 30, 1864 (possibly more)

Portsmouth
Newspapers published in Portsmouth, New Hampshire:

 Federal Observer. W., Nov. 22, 1798-May 29, 1800.
 Fowle's New-Hampshire Gazette, and General Advertiser. W., Dec. 24, 1784-June 2, 1787.
 The Freeman's Journal, or, New-Hampshire Gazette. W., May 25, 1776 – June 9, 1778.
 The New-Hampshire Gazette. W., Oct. 7, 1756-Mar. 4, 1763.
 The New-Hampshire Gazette. W., Apr. 16, 1793-Dec. 30, 1800+
 The New-Hampshire Gazette, and General Advertiser. W., Sept. 8, 1781-Dec. 17, 1784.
 The New-Hampshire Gazette, and Historical Chronicle. W., Mar. 11, 1763-Jan. 9, 1776.
 The New-Hampshire Gazette, and the General Advertiser. W., June 9, 1787-Apr. 9, 1793.
 New-Hampshire Gazette, or, State Journal, and General Advertiser. W., June 16, 1778 – June 4, 1781.
 New-Hampshire Gazette, State Journal, and General Advertiser. W., June 11-Sept. 3, 1781.
 The New-Hampshire Mercury, and the Gen.,eral Advertiser. W., Dec. 24, 1784-Mar. 12, 1788.
 The New-Hampshire Spy. S.W., Oct. 24, 1786-Mar. 3, 1789.
 The Oracle of the Day. S.W., W., June 4, 1793-Dec. 28, 1799.

 Osborne's New-Hampshire Spy. S.W., W., Mar. 6, 1789- Mar. 2, 1793.
 The Portsmouth Mercury, and Weekly Advertiser. W., Jan. 21, 1765-Sept. 29, 1766.
 The Republican Ledger. W., Aug. 29, 1799-Dec. 30, 1800+
 The United States Oracle of the Day. W., Jan. 4-Dec. 27, 1800+

Walpole
Newspapers published in Walpole, New Hampshire:

 Farmer's Museum, or, Lay Preacher's Gazette. W., Apr. 1, 1799-Feb. 10, 1800.
 Farmers' Museum, or, Literary Gazette. W., Feb. 17- Dec. 29, 1800+
 The Farmer's Weekly Museum: Newhampshire and Vermont Journal. W., Apr. 4, 1797-Mar. 25, 1799.
 The Newhampshire and Vermont Journal, or, The Farmer's Weekly Museum. W., Apr. 11, 1794-Mar. 28, 1797.
 The Newhampshire Journal, or, The Farmer's Weekly Museum. W., Apr. 11, 1793-Apr. 4, 1794.

See also
 List of radio stations in New Hampshire
 List of television stations in New Hampshire

Adjoining states
 List of newspapers in Maine
 List of newspapers in Massachusetts
 List of newspapers in Vermont

References

Further reading

External links
 . (Survey of local news existence and ownership in 21st century)

New Hampshire